Joseph Tortelier (1854–1925) was a carpenter, labor activist, and anarchist who advocated for the general strike and consumption based on need.

References

Further reading 

 

1854 births
1925 deaths
French anarchists